Alessio Curcio (born 12 March 1990) is an Italian professional footballer who plays as a striker for  club Catanzaro.

Career

Juventus
Curcio made 6 starts out of 15 appearances for Juventus Primavera reserve team in 2008–09 season, scoring 2 goals. Curcio also lent to Juventus' Berretti U18 team in June 2009 along with Antonio Piccolo, losing to A.C. Milan in the final. However Milan fielded much more member from Primavera team and born 1990 and 1989 compared to Juve Berretti.

Curcio was promoted from the Juventus youth setup in the summer of 2009 and trained with the first team prior to his  to Lega Pro club F.C. Canavese. In his two seasons with the club, the young midfielder made 48 appearances with 7 goals.

After Canavese withdrew from professional league, Curcio was signed by Casale.

On 9 January 2020 he signed a 1.5-year contract with Catania.

On 4 October 2020 he moved to Foggia.

On 13 August 2022, Curcio joined Catanzaro on a two-year contract.

Notes

External links

 

1990 births
Living people
Sportspeople from Benevento
Footballers from Campania
Italian footballers
Association football forwards
Serie C players
Lega Pro Seconda Divisione players
Serie D players
Juventus F.C. players
F.C. Canavese players
Casale F.B.C. players
A.C. Renate players
Nuorese Calcio players
Arzachena Academy Costa Smeralda players
L.R. Vicenza players
Catania S.S.D. players
Calcio Foggia 1920 players
U.S. Catanzaro 1929 players